The Siberian elm cultivar Ulmus pumila 'Hansen' is a little-known American tree of obscure origin, possibly raised from seed collected by the horticulturist and botanist Prof. Niels Hansen during his expedition to Siberia in 1897.

Description
Very similar to the species. A specimen planted in 1978 at the Sir Harold Hillier Gardens in England had attained a height of 8 m by 2002.

Cultivation
The tree's current status in North America is not known; at least three mature specimens survive in the UK. Significantly, it is not listed in Green's digest of elm cultivar names published in 1964, suggesting a rather belated introduction to commerce.

Pests and diseases
See under Ulmus pumila.

Synonymy
?'Hansen's Hybrid': Jewell Nursery (ceased trading 2001), Lake City, Minnesota, United States. Wholesale Price List, Fall, 1968 - Spring 1969, p 6, described as "with larger leaf than Chinese (Elm)", but without provenance details.

Accessions

Europe
Brighton & Hove City Council, UK, NCCPG Elm Collection.
Sir Harold Hillier Gardens, UK. Acc. no. 1978.1606
Winkworth Arboretum, Surrey, UK. Tree planted 1975, plot K 37.

References

Siberian elm cultivar
Ulmus articles with images